Białężyn refers to the following places in Poland:

 Białężyn, Czarnków-Trzcianka County
 Białężyn, Poznań County